The Singles 1999–2006 is the second box set compilation by British rock band Coldplay. Released on 26 March 2007 by Parlophone in the United Kingdom and Capitol Records in the United States, it features The Blue Room (1999) and all singles from their early years until X&Y (2005). The latter were accompanied by their respective B-sides and pressed on 7" vinyl contained in sleeves with the original artwork. A press for "What If", a promotional radio single in selected countries, was included as well.

Background 
Following the launching of Coldplay's third album, X&Y (2005), Billboard reported the band were working with producer Brian Eno for its successor and aiming for a late 2007 release. On 31 January 2007, they announced The Singles 1999–2006 would be released later that year in the United Kingdom, while a spokesperson for Capitol Records confirmed the box set would also be available in the United States, but did not disclosed the date. Additionally, the band stated the compilation would not be released in CD format.

Reception 
While writing for NME, Mark Beaumont rated the box set with 6/10 stars, praising the musical progression Coldplay have made over the years, but criticizing the B-sides selection consisted of "dreary acoustic rock slurry" songs. He also stated it was "like releasing every deleted scene from Last of the Summer Wine in a special edition bathtub on wheels". Jake Kennedy, from Record Collector, gave 4/5 stars and commented "there are a few treats here for the hardcore fans" and "simply massive tracks that have soundtracked weddings, funerals and stag nights" around the country in the last seven years. adding the box set made a "pattern" between tracks evident, "but if you're doing something right, why stop?". The compilation debuted at number five in the Danish Albums chart. However, it failed to gain traction in other markets, with its first appearance in the UK Albums Chart (at number 196) only happening in 2016.

Track listing 
All songs written by Coldplay (Guy Berryman, Jonny Buckland, Will Champion and Chris Martin) except for track 14, which was written by Leslie Bricusse and John Barry.

References

External links
 Coldplay Official Website
 Coldplay on AllMusic

Coldplay compilation albums
2007 compilation albums
Parlophone compilation albums
B-side compilation albums
Alternative rock compilation albums
Rock compilation albums
Pop compilation albums
Pop rock compilation albums
Albums produced by Chris Allison
Albums produced by Ken Nelson (British record producer)
Albums produced by Danton Supple